110 Karat is the fifth studio album by Swiss singer Luca Hänni. It is scheduled to be released on 9 October 2020 by Muve Recordings. The album marks Hänni's first album to be primarily recorded in German.

Singles
"Nebenbei" was released as the lead single from the album on 20 December 2019. The song peaked at number sixty-four on the Swiss Singles Chart. "Nie mehr allein" was released as the second single from the album on 6 March 2020. "Diamant" was released as the third single from the album on 22 May 2020. The song peaked at number sixty-five on the Swiss Singles Chart.

Track listing
Credits adapted from Tidal.

Charts

Weekly charts

Year-end charts

Release history

References

2020 albums
Luca Hänni albums